The  Washington Redskins season was the franchise's 35th season in the National Football League (NFL) and their 30th in Washington, D.C.The Washington Redskins attempted to make Vince Lombardi their new head coach, but Lombardi refused their offer and the Redskins had to settle for Otto Graham instead. They finished with a 7–7 record, fifth place in the eight-team Eastern Conference.

In Week Twelve, the Redskins set an NFL record for most points by one team in a regular season game, scoring 72 points against the Giants. (Incidentally, this was one point less than the all-time record, the 73 scored by Chicago in the 1940 NFL Championship Game, in which the Redskins surrendered 11 touchdowns and were shut out.)

Offseason

NFL Draft

Roster

Regular season

Schedule

Season summary

Week 10 vs Cowboys

Standings

Roster

Awards, records, and honors
Most points in a single game in regular season NFL history

References

Washington
Washington Redskins seasons
Washing